Toothache plant may refer to:
Acmella alba
 Acmella oleracea